Hamann Motorsport GmbH is a German car tuning company based in Laupheim. It specialises in Audi, Aston Martin, Bentley, BMW, Mini, Ferrari, Fiat, Jaguar, Land Rover, Maserati, Mercedes, Rolls-Royce, Porsche and Lamborghini cars. Hamann Motorsport was founded by Richard Hamann in 1986.

The company was founded only to work with cars made in Germany, specifically BMW, but since then, has expanded its business into other car manufacturers such as Lamborghini, Porsche, Aston Martin and Ferrari. It also creates its own, one-of-a-kind cars.

Hamann offers cosmetic changes such as low profile spoilers, bodykits, carbon fiber splitters, and multi-piece alloy wheels. Other upgrades include racing LSDs, open racing exhaust systems, twelve-piston disc brakes, and engine remapping. The company orders crate engines from the dealership and then redesigns them. The company designs and builds upon numerous parts of the original car, such as tuning the car's engine, lowering the car, making a new body with more features, and installing racing tires.

The first car from Hamann Motorsport was the BMW M3 (E30), producing 348 PS (256 kW) from a 2.3L R4 engine (with a turbocharger). The car accelerated from 0-60 mph in 5.1 seconds and reach a top speed of 170 mph (273 km/h).

Hamann Motorsport designed a variety of cars, for instance, the Lamborghini Murciélago LP640. Hamann Motorsport built the engine from scratch to enhance the horsepower to reach 690HP by modifying the engine management system and installing a custom made exhaust system. For the exterior Hamann Motorsport did not change much, they only installed the matte black wheels.

See also

 Mansory, another multi-brand prestigious automobile tuning company
 Prior Design, multi-brand automobile tuning company, specialises in Audi, BMW,  Ford, Jaguar, Lamborghini, Mercedes-Benz, Range Rover and Porsche.

References

External links 
 
 Hamann Motorsport GB official UK distributor website

Laupheim
Automotive companies of Germany
Automotive motorsports and performance companies
Auto tuning companies